Developmental dysfluency, or "normal dysfluency", is a lack of language fluency that occurs during early childhood development. It is commonly observed in children ages 2 to 4 years old. This typically occurs as they begin to learn language and communication skills. Developmental dysfluency refers to speech that is continually interrupted rather than flowing naturally. Developmental dysfluency is most commonly expressed through inconsistencies in speech such as stuttering, repetition, lengthening of sounds and syllables, mistiming, and poor inflection.

Speech is a complicated skill involving a series of cognitive and linguistic processes that are both sensorimotor and auditory. As children grow, their language and vocabulary grow exponentially. Dysfluencies in early speech are typical as their speech skills develop. The most common form of dysfluency in children younger than three years is the repetition of one-syllable words or parts of words. Words or syllables are often repeated in the beginning of their sentences as they try to process how to form the rest of the sentence.

Language dysfluency may be common in children as they learn basic language skills throughout the crucial development stages in early childhood. Developmental dysfluency is normal in children as they work to acquire language skills and semantic/syntactic processing. About twenty-five percent of children experience some loss in fluency in their linguistic abilities. Some children between the ages of 2 and 6 encounter some obstacles in the path to fluent speech. Fluency in a normal child will typically improve around the age of 4. When attempting to master spoken language, children gradually develop fluent speech. Children go through the same learning patterns while developing their first language as adults do when learning languages other than their native language.

Although many adults display types of dysfluency, it is usually in relation to comprehending or expressing different materials under stress. Developmental dysfluency is a normal part of the acquisition of language. An individual may not be fluent in language due to frequent stuttering or as a result of neurogenic dysfunction.

The origin of stuttering is not yet fully understood but parents/adults can mitigate the risk of developmental dysfluency by reducing the conversational demands on their child. Modeling slow, smooth speech and acknowledging the demanding and complex nature of learning language can help.

Symptoms 
Symptoms of developmental dysfluency include the repetition of sounds or pauses between words. These symptoms have generally been noted within children from 18 months to 5 years of age. This may persist for weeks or months but eventually disappears due to the maturation of the child's nervous system. Children with a family history of stuttering are more likely to develop the disorder than those without.

ex.: "Mommy, I am, I am, um, I am..."

Usually, this language dysfluency is a transitional stage that most children will leave behind as they master oral communications. At this point, there is little to no need for any therapeutic intervention. The typical occurrence lies between the ages of 18 months and 7 years as children pass through stages of speech dysfluency as they learn how to talk. Those with these types of dysfluencies will exhibit the afore mentioned repetitions about once every 10 sentences

Mistiming and stuttering are common ways that developmental dysfluency manifests itself. When a child mistimes, they prolong a certain letter/syllable in the word they are saying, thereby taking much longer for their sentence to be said. Pauses or blocking are another side effect relating to developmental dysfluency. This is when one inserts a silent interval within the word. Revision is similar to this but is the halting completely, mid-flow of a sentence and taking the thought in a different direction. There is evidence to show that this may not only be an issue of speech motor areas but also the auditory cortex. In a MEG study by Beal et al. they found that adults with "persistent developmental stuttering" or PDS, had slower cortical timing than those who spoke completely fluent. This shows us something is wrong in their auditory motor integration. As far as the underlying ailments behind stuttering, It is not well known whether this side effect has to do with "errors in linguistic planning" or issues with "access or retrieval of linguistic elements" and it could very well involve both issues.

On occasion, children will go beyond the normal dysfluency patterns. Instances like the previously mentioned example indicate that the child is learning to use language. In contrast, children with stuttering disorder, will likely repeat sounds or one-syllable words three or more times. They may also prolong sounds for two or more seconds. In comparison, stuttering can be seen as a process where a word appears to become "stuck," and the person may grimace, jerk the head or neck as he struggles to overcome the stutter.

Characteristics 
Characteristics of developmental dysfluency include:
 Repeating phrases (e.g. "he ate-he ate my cookie)
 Use of filler words (um, uh, like, ah, etc)
 No tension of physical inability and struggle to speak
 Lack of problematic behaviors when speaking
 No negative reaction or frustration
 Appearance of dysfluencies only last less than 6 months

Children with normal dysfluency tend to have stuttering difficulties that come and go. Generally this is during preschool years and the problem normally ceases altogether by the time a child starts school. Everyone experiences periods of dysfluency - normal speech patterns include about 2-4% interruptions in flow or fluency. Revisions, word and phrase repetitions and interjections are all common in children speech (see typical dysfluencies below) whereas; sound and syllable repetition, sound prolongation and broken words are much more atypical.

Typical dysfluency examples 
The term dysfluency is used to describe normal irregularities that occur during speech. As children begin to learn how to communicate with language some will experience issues between the ages of 2-6. These can include:
 Phrase revisions or abandoned utterances ("I'm want. Can I have...")
 Hesitations between words ("Can you give me ... blocks")
 Multisyllabic word repetitions ("Gimme, Wanna ... etc)
 Phrase repetitions ("I need I need I need ... a hug")
 Interjections/interruptions in sentence structure ("You're ummm, really funny")

Children are learning language and linguistics among many other things. It is speculated that children will experience developmental linguistic delays at some point due to their muscle and motor plans not working as quickly as their brains. While they are learning speech, they are also developmentally mastering other skills (walking, potty training, motor skills, etc.)

The origin of stuttering is not yet fully understood but parents/adults can mitigate the risk of developmental dysfluency by reducing the conversational demands on their child. Modeling slow, smooth speech and acknowledging the demanding and complex nature of learning language can help.

Background 
Speech is a complicated achievement that involves a series of cognitive, linguistic, sensorimotor and auditory processes that generate an in-depth understanding of language and speech. As children grow up their language and vocabulary grows with them. However, as this happens it is possible that the child might begin to demonstrate forms of disfluencies in their speech as they struggle to get words out when they are engaged in conversation or speaking in general.

Preschool children usually go through a period of dysfluency as they attempt to learn linguistic and speech skills. About 10% of these children will experience a speech or language delay that is serious enough to benefit from early referral and assessment by a speech language pathologist. Normal disfluency begins during a child's intensive language learning years and resolves on its own as the child undergoes growth and development. This is considered the normal phase of language development.

Most children will outgrow the period of dysfluency but those who do not will require speech therapy.Therefore, it is necessary that there is a distinction between childhood dysfluency, that will likely correct itself and other disorders, such as stuttering. The most common form of dysfluency in children younger than 3 years of age is the repetition of one syllable words or parts of words, especially at the beginning of their sentences as they try to form the sentence correctly ("I-I-I want my toy).

Language learning in some children may be more problematic than that of others. As a child grows, their language and vocabulary will grow with them. Due to the large input they are receiving throughout their development it is inevitable that some forms of dysfluencies will be present in their communication efforts. These occurrences, however, are normal. When attempting to master our complex spoken language, children's fluency will increase as their proficiency in the language increases. In a similar way to if an adult learns a second language, children may go through the same learning patterns as they learn their first language. Research specifically in computational linguistics has shown that there is a correlation that exists between native language and patterns of dysfluencies that can occur beyond developmental stages. If a child is bilingual, meaning they are learning two languages at once, they are more likely to experience prolonged periods of dysfluency as they try to work out the differences between the two language inputs they have been receiving.

The brain and language development 

As a child attempts to develop their language acquisition as one of the most fundamental human traits it is the brain that undergoes the developmental changes. During the phases of language acquisition the brain both stores linguistic information and adapts to the grammatical regularities and irregularities of language. Recent advances in Functional neuroimaging (fMRI) have contributed to the system leave analysis of the brain in relation to linguistic processing.

In order for language to be obtained, there needs to be brain stimulation and memory processes at work in order to form the correct brain pathways. When synapses are stimulated repeatedly that pattern of neural connections is then written into the brain and it becomes a more efficient permanent pathway that allows signals to be quickly transmitted. In terms of language, these pathways need to be created in order to remember and understand the language and communicate with it.

During specific periods in a child's development the brain is active in forming connections for different abilities, one of which being language. Infants start out able to distinguish sound and process different auditory stimuli but after six months they are only able to do so in their native language. As infants hear sounds repeated a different cluster of neurons in the auditory cortex of the brain that responds to sound. During preschool years, the development of syntax and grammar takes place. It is during this period that children begin to exhibit symptoms of developmental dysfluency if they have it. At this point, because they are learning language and other motor activities, their brain take in an overload of information and often will backtrack in language development as they try to pair linguistics to sound and syntax.

Prevalence and prognosis 
Preschool children usually go through a period of dysfluency as they attempt to learn linguistic and speech skills. About 10% of these children will experience a speech or language delay that is serious enough for them to benefit from early referral and assessment by a speech language pathologist. Normal dysfluency begins during a child's intensive language years and dissipates as the child continues to grow and develop. These dysfluencies are considered a normal phase of language development.

Additionally, 85% of children, before preschool age will experience developmental dysfluency. These children won't require intervention because their dysfluency is a normal part of their development. 1 in 12 children, ages 3–17, will experience issues with their speech that is not considered within the normal realm of developmental dysfluency. However, only half of those individuals will receive intervention and speech therapy.

Children who do not require speech therapy will often outgrow the period of dysfluency. Experts find that there is a distinction between childhood dysfluency that will likely correct itself and other disorders such as stuttering.

Dysfluency disorders 
The following disorders can be diagnosed following the years in which speech pattern disruptions could be the result of developmental dysfluency that is common within the age range of 2–6 years old. There are types of dysfluencies that are normal developmental processes and others that are more abnormal and atypical.

Stuttering 

Stuttering is the most common dysfluency disorder. it is an interruption in the flow of speaking characterized by repetitions, sound prolongations, and blocks that change the rhythm of sleep. A disturbance in the normal fluency and time patterning of speech that is inappropriate for the age of the person. Stuttering typically has its origins in childhood. Most who stutter will begin to do so around 2.5 years of age. Approximately 95% of children who stutter will start to do so before the age of 5.

Stuttering symptoms may include dysfluencies such as hesitations, word fillers, nonword fillers, silent pauses, and interjections. All very similar to developmental dysfluency symptoms. Less typical stuttering will include sound/syllable repetitions, prolongations, and blocks. Stuttering can also occur with other speech and sound disorders, and intellectual language disabilities.

Stuttering can greatly interfere with school, work or social interactions. Children who stutter may also experience fear or anxiety about social settings or public speaking. Speech patterns and behaviors that might signal that a child is potentially going to develop a stuttering disorder can include within-word or part0word repetitions prolonged sounds, avoiding speaking situations, looking frustrated or upset and tense appearance in neck muscles.

If stuttering is familial there is likely a genetic mutation that causes the disorder. Unlike the aforementioned typical dysfluencies, stuttering can be a result of genetics. Mutations on the GNPTAB, GNPTG, and NAGPA have been found to disrupt the signal that directs enzymes to target locations in the brain and cause stuttering in vocal and linguistic processes.

Cluttering 

Cluttering (Tachyphemia) is a fluency disorder that can co-occur with stuttering but may also occur individually. When someone is experiencing cluttering disorder their conversation segments may be perceived as too fast, too irregular or both. Other symptoms may include stuttering, language or phonological errors, and attention deficits. It may result from disorganized speech planning or being unsure of what to say.

Both cluttering and stuttering are forms of fluency disorders that develop beyond the key years of about ages 2–6. During these ages, dysfluency is mainly just considered to be developmental dysfluency. Cluttering, unlike stuttering, can be distinguished by little to no physical structure, little to no secondary behaviors, decreased awareness of speech problems and the aforementioned typical dysfluencies such as revisions and interjections.

Both stuttering and cluttering both have a genetic component. About 1/3 of those who stutter will also clutter which can prove even more difficult to overcome with Speech therapy. A consequence of cluttering is individuals may not be willing to attempt to repair breakdowns in communication which may result in less effective social integration and interactions that can lead to a sense of isolation, anxiety, and depression.

Differences between disorders and developmental dysfluency 
There are several warning signs of speech delays that are not considered developmentally normal.
 Babies that don't "coo" or babble
 Babies that don't respond to noise or speech around them
 Their first words have not been spoken by 15 months
 They have a 50-word vocabulary, or less, by two years old
 Others struggle to understand what the child is saying at 3 years or older
 Other adults should be able to understand at least 75% of what child says. 
 Struggles to follow simple instructions at 2 years old and beyond
 Has speech sound error after five years old
 "t", "d" and "n" should be pronounced correctly by age 3

Experts recommend an initial evaluation by a pediatrician, who might also recommend an evaluation by a speech-language pathologist.

Indications for referral to a speech language pathologist 
Indications include:
 Doubt as to the nature of the child's speech changes
 Exhibit of reactions of avoidance or escape (pauses, interjections, eye blinks and head nods)
 Three or more stuttering dysfluencies (e.g. b-but, a-and, thi-this) per 100 syllables uttered.

Children may feel a demand to start speaking at a higher level and can have difficulties with speech that exhibits the following patterns:
 Fast-paced speech rate with few pauses
 The use of several questions in a sentence
 Interruption
 Lack of learning time
 If their teacher/parent does not listen to them

When those around a child speak too quickly or input several questions within one sentence, the child must engage several cortices as well as comprehension skills in order to verbally respond to the person they are talking to. If the child lacks learning time as they develop, they will be unable to process harder words and hit a stalling point in sentence comprehension. Normal children may be dysfluent at any time butter likely to increase their dysfluencies when they are tired, excited, upset or being rushed to speak. The dysfluencies may appear in a cycle meaning that they may increase in frequency for several days or weeks and then be hardly noticeable again for weeks or months and could return again following this until the behavior is outgrown.

Usually, children with normal dysfluencies such as these appear to be unaware that they are occurring and show no signs of surprise or frustration. It is evident that the child is not struggling to speak but rather taking more time to complete a thought or sentence.

See also 
 ADHD
 Aphasia
 Articulation disorder
 Child development
 Language disorder
 Learning disability

References

Sources
 Trubo, Richard (2001). "Stuttering". The New Book Of Knowledge - Health and Medicine: 112–123. United States of America: Grolier Incorporated. . Note: This annual was also published under the title The 2001 World Book Health & Medical Annual, United States of America: 2001 World Book, Inc.
Stuttering (disfluency). Cincinnati Children's. (n.d.).
 

Speech disorders
Developmental disabilities
Human development
Child development